Andrew Gibb may refer to:

Andrew Dewar Gibb (1888–1974), Scottish politician and barrister
Andrew Gibb Maitland (1864–1951), Australian geologist
Andy Gibb (1958–1988), singer